George Drought Warburton (1816–1857) was an Irish soldier, politician and writer on Canada.

Life
The third son of George Warburton of Aughrim, County Galway, and younger brother of Bartholomew Elliott George Warburton, known as Eliot, he was born at Wicklow. He was educated at the Royal Military College, Woolwich, and served in the Royal Artillery from June 1833.

In 1837 Warburton was sent with a detachment of the royal artillery to assist the Auxiliary Legion in Spain, and was seriously wounded in action. In the middle of July 1844 he embarked from Chatham for Canada. He returned from Canada in 1846, and was later stationed at Landguard Fort, near Harwich in Essex.

In November 1854 Warburton retired from the army as major on full pay, and resided at Henley House, Frant, Sussex. Apparently subject to pains, he shot himself through the head at Henley House on 23 October 1857, aged 41. He was buried at Iffley, near Oxford.

Works
Warburton wrote a description of the dominion of Canada, under its ancient vernacular name, as Hochelaga; or England in the New World (1846). The work was published anonymously, in two volumes, as "edited by Eliot Warburton", and the fifth edition, revised, came out in 1854. It was also printed in New York, although the part on the United States was uncomplimentary. He wrote also:

The Conquest of Canada (1850), anonymous, in two volumes. This passed through three British editions in England, and was issued at New York in 1850. 
Memoir of Charles Mordaunt, Earl of Peterborough and Monmouth, by the author of "Hochelaga" (1853), 2 vols.

Family
Warburton married at St. George's, Hanover Square, on 1 June 1853, Elizabeth Augusta Bateman-Hanbury, third daughter of William Hanbury Bateman, 1st Baron Bateman, and had an only daughter, who became the wife of Lord Edward Spencer-Churchill. In April 1869 his widow married George Rushout, 3rd Baron Northwick, and she was in 1886 the recipient of the Dunmow flitch.

Notes

External links
 

Attribution
 

1816 births
1857 deaths
Royal Artillery officers
Irish male writers
Members of the Parliament of the United Kingdom for English constituencies
People from Wicklow (town)
UK MPs 1857–1859
19th-century Irish writers
Suicides by firearm in England
Irish politicians who committed suicide
Graduates of the Royal Military Academy, Woolwich
1850s suicides
People from Frant